Ricki Lamie (born 26 June 1993) is a Scottish professional footballer, who plays as a defender for Motherwell.

He has previously played for Airdrieonians, Queen's Park, Greenock Morton, East Stirlingshire, Bathgate Thistle, Clyde and Livingston.

Career
Lamie started his senior career when he moved to Airdrieonians (then called Airdrie United) in 2011 from his youth team Whitburn Boys Club. In his first season with Airdrie's youth team, he won the club's U19 Player of the Year award.

Whilst at Airdrie he had three loan spells at Bathgate Thistle, Clyde and East Stirlingshire.

In the summer of 2014, Lamie signed up with Morton on a short-term contract. This was extended in January, and he signed on against for the 2015–16 season in May 2015.

His contract was again extended in May 2016, this time for one year. After a successful campaign in 2016–17, Lamie signed up for another season.

In June 2018, Lamie signed for Livingston.

On 10 June 2020, Motherwell announced the signing of Lamie on a contract until the summer of 2022.

On 28 January 2022, Lamie signed a pre-contract agreement with Dundee. On 9 April, Lamie would score a last-minute goal against former team Livingston to secure top-six football for Motherwell. Lamie would score another key goal for Motherwell the next month, netting a winning goal against Hearts which guaranteed the Steelmen European football the next season. The big goals for Motherwell created questions whether Lamie would join Dundee next season, and Lamie confirmed there was a relegation clause in his pre-contract agreement and stated that things were "still up in the air". On 24 May, Lamie officially signed a new two-year extension with Motherwell.

Career statistics

Personal life
Lamie was found to be the fittest player in the SFL in 2013.

Honours
Morton
Scottish League One: Winners 2014–15

References

External links

See also
Greenock Morton F.C. season  2014–15 | 2015–16

1993 births
Living people
Sportspeople from Shotts
Greenock Morton F.C. players
Association football defenders
Scottish footballers
Queen's Park F.C. players
Bathgate Thistle F.C. players
Scottish Junior Football Association players
Airdrieonians F.C. players
East Stirlingshire F.C. players
Scottish Professional Football League players
Livingston F.C. players
Motherwell F.C. players
Footballers from North Lanarkshire
Scottish Football League players